The 2021 Northern Arizona Lumberjacks football team represented Northern Arizona University as a member of the Big Sky Conference during the 2021 NCAA Division I FCS football season. They were led by third-year head coach Chris Ball and played their home games at the Walkup Skydome.

Previous season

The Lumberjacks finished the 2020–21 season 3–2 to finish in a tie for fourth place.

Preseason

Polls
On July 26, 2021, during the virtual Big Sky Kickoff, the Lumberjacks were predicted to finish seventh in the Big Sky by both the coaches and media.

Preseason All–Big Sky team
The Lumberjacks had two players selected to the preseason all-Big Sky team.

Defense

Morgan Vest – S

Special teams

Luis Aguilar – K

Schedule

Game summaries

No. 1 Sam Houston

at South Dakota

at Arizona

at Northern Colorado

Idaho State

Southern Utah

at No. 19 Sacramento State

at Idaho

No. 8 UC Davis

No. 9 Montana

at Cal Poly

References

Northern Arizona
Northern Arizona Lumberjacks football seasons
Northern Arizona Lumberjacks football